The Nissan Hi-Cross is a concept SUV designed by the Japanese Nissan Motors Company. This concept was unveiled at the 2012 Geneva Motor Show. It also carried with the modern philosophy of design and the new technology of Nissan.

Nissan has added a number of streamlining elements of rectangle and cross-country appearance design to the Hi-cross concept SUV for improvement from the previous convention, including larger size sports alloy wheels, new designed distinct character line from the hood down its flanks to D-pillar and others, which made the vehicle to be a more fashion and younger SUV .

This concept SUV was also an experiment and a show of the new technology invented by the Nissan Company. Instead of the traditional large displacement engine, Nissan equipped the Hi-Cross with a 2.0-liter gas and electric hybrid engine to save the energy and reduce the pollution. And the newly designed CVT transmission will reduce more fuel than before.

As the concept Hi-cross was a compact or middle size SUV with normal 5 or 7 seats, it was estimated that the processor of the concept Hi-cross might be the third generation of Nissan X-Trail  and its main competitors will be the Toyota RAV4, Honda CR-V and Mazda CX-5.

Overview

Background 
In 2012, Japanese Motors Company, Nissan unveiled its new concept SUV, which was named as Hi-cross to the world in the 2012 Geneva International Auto Show and also made its debut at the 2012 Los Angeles Auto Show for the North American market, which carried with the dramatic and athletic designing than before and the advanced technology of Nissan. According to the manufacturers, the 'Hi' means high-riding, high innovation, high excitement and high extended value.

Design 
Compared to the previous conservative and cross-country SUV design, Nissan has added a significant number of modern and athletic designing elements for both the appearance and the interior of the Hi-cross concept SUV.

For the styling of appearance, it combined the existing Nissan SUV designing with some new elements. In the front of the SUV, it has a characteristic V-shaped Nissan grille set off by distinctive and deeply tapered LED headlamps rather than the rectangle and halogen lamps before. For the two sides of the SUV, it was designed by the combination of deeply tapered LED headlamps and the curved hood line, metallic splash guard and 21-inch sports alloy wheels. And the whole SUV was adopted a progressive crossover design, which was the character line  extended from the hood down its flanks down to the D-pillar. At the back of the Hi-Cross Concept,  it was set off by a sculpted rear hatchback and extended rear roof spoiler and there were some stylish and trapezoidal LED tail lights that reflected the headlamp.  And from the exhibition car, it can be found that the fog lamps perfectly fit with the deep custom Aurora Green painting, which was accordance with the Aesthetic design.

Moreover, the most dramatic designing of Hi-cross SUV was the inter-space of the car. According to the data released by Nissan, the size of the Hi-cross concept SUV was 4660 mm long, 1850 mm wide and 1670 mm tall which was normally like a compact exterior. However, the inside of Hi-cross was roomy with a 109.4-inch wheelbase and three rows of seating for seven, which made it more like a middle size SUV. This will made the car have larger loading and more inter-space for passengers, which would make the Hi-cross concept SUV be more competitive.

And when going inside, it can be found that he Hi-Cross Concept's cockpit was dominated by a T-wing shaped dash which would  brought an elevated sense of connection for the driver and front passenger.  And the T-wing dash which was designed by a sculpted center console, matched the two-tone door panels and wonderful styled steering wheel.

Technology 
The main technologies of Nissan Hi-cross concept SUV were about the new engine and the new transmission.

Engine 
Instead of the traditional large displacement V6 engine, the High-cross SUV was equipped with a hybrid 2.0-liter direct injection petrol  engine and electric motor. The Hi-cross would rely in the petrol engine as the main power, while the electric motor will reduce the emissions and save the economy. Meanwhile, the power outputted by the new hybrid engine was expected to achieve the level of a 2.5-litter engine, which would not decrease the efficiency of the car.

According to Nissan, the lithium-ion battery which powered the electric motor will be fast-charging and high output, it was coupled to a 2.0-liter supercharged direct injection petrol engine, which was a success of the innovation and has developed for the award-winning technology, Nissan LEAF®.

Under the innovation of engine, it would be affordable and packaged to adopt "one-motor, two clutch" technology, which was the first clutch was installed between patrol engine and electric motor for fully decoupling the patrol engine when the car was driving in electricity and the second clutch would be located behind the transmission for helping smooth the transition. In this way, more energy would be saved and fully used to increase the working efficiency of the engine and save the fuel.

Transmission 
The other advanced technology of the Hi-cross was the new generation XTRONIC CVT transmission.

For the Hi-Cross, it was adopted the HEV drivetrain, which was based on the technology modified by four-wheel drive models rather than the previous front-wheel drive wheels. And the innovation of the new system, whose approach was affording and packing adopts 'one-motor, two clutch' technology, was attribute to the Nissan's new generation XTRONIC  continuously variable CVT transmission, which would achieve a 10 percent improvement in the fuel emission comparing with the previous generation's CVT transmissions.

The new generation XTRONIC CVT transmission would be a low-friction  and smaller shaft-diameter pulleys designed, which would provide the widest ratio coverage for shifting more smoothly to enhance the efficiency. The new advanced XTRONIC  CVT transmission would be more smooth and could be better coordinated with the advanced 2.0 hybrid  engine and the new all wheels system, which made the Hi-cross to be an economy vehicle with higher level technology and excellent performance.

Influences and Successor

Influences  
Since the new designing of the appearance was sleeker and rounder, the designing of the interior was exquisite and athletic of the concept Hi-cross SUV, this showed the Nissan was clear to the SUV fashion designing around the world and had already lead the crossover segment in the world. And this has also showed the Nissan might have a large competitiveness of the designing in the market of SUV in future. And the advanced technology of the hybrid engine and the CVT transmission would reduce fuel use by 10%, which would reduce more   emissions and save the fuel energy, which was accordance with the view of environmental production and energy economy. Also the decreasing fuel will made the Hi-cross more economic and will increase the cost performance of the SUV and hence if the Hi-cross publish to the market, there will be more consumers interested in it because of the economy saving property.  All of their influences would make Nissan have a strong competitiveness in the market.

Successor 
Comparing with other SUVs in the Nissan Family, the Hi-cross concept SUV was bigger than the small-size SUV, Juke, whose size was wheelbase 2,530 mm, 4,125 mm length, 1,765 mm width and 1,570 mm height but was still smaller than the Mid-size SUV, Pathfinder (wheelbase 2,649 mm, 5,042 mm length, 1,689 width and 1,768 height). Hence, it might be a compact SUV.

And considering the size and power, it was similar to the second generation Nissan X-trail, which was wheelbase 2,629 mm, 4,640 mm length,1,806 mm width and 1,780 mm height, 2.0 L and 2.5 L engine. It was estimated that the Hi-cross concept SUV had a large possibility to be the new generation (3rd) of the Nissan X-Trail.

Potential competitors 
Since it was estimated by the motor manufacturers and other automobile distribution platforms that the Hi-cross Concept SUV might be the third generation of Nissan X-trail, there might be some competitors in the market of future for the Hi-cross SUV.

Firstly, as the engine of Hi-cross was 2.0 L hybrid of gas and electric and would normally output the power of a 2.5 L gas engine which was used by Mazda CX-5 now, it was estimated that one of a major competitor for Hi-cross in future might be the Mazda CX-5, which had a good selling and reputation in the present market and has already been one of the competitors of second generation Nissan X-trail. However, as the design of Nissan Hi-cross concept SUV was more modern and fashionable, and the size of Hi-cross was also a bit larger than Mazda CX-5. There is strong possibility for Hi-cross to exceed the sales volume of CX-5.

On the other hand, as the top-selling in the market of compact size SUV, Toyota RAV4 was always been called the best cost-efficient compact SUV because of the cheaper price, good quality and fuel-efficient. Hence, if the Hi-cross SUV would be officially put on sale in future, it would also face to competing with RAV4. And for preparing this, Hi-cross had better continue advancing their technology and the designing. For the technology, it should make the energy-efficiency and power much better, which can be improved by modifying the performance of engine and make the transmission much more smooth, the chassis and the system of all wheel drive more steady. And for the inside designing, the Hi-cross should pay more attention on increasing the safety and comfort of passengers and installing more advanced electronic equipment and vehicle-mounted system.

Other potential competitors could be the Honda CR-V, Hyundai Santa Fe and Mitsubishi Outlander, because they were also the main competitors of previous Nissan X-Trail before the Hi-Cross. The Honda CR-V has the larger and more comfortable space for passengers and more perfectly laid out and dashboard for the driver. And because the CR-V's displacement was smaller than the previous X-Trail, it could be much cheaper to purchase CR-V rather than X-Trail. The Hyundai Santa Fe had a premium and stylish looking for both outside and inside than the X-Trail and it was a mid-size SUV, whose level was higher than the X-Trail but will not paid much extra money. And comparing with X-Trail, the Mitsubishi Outlander had the more advanced inside technology, which were sat-nav, cruise control and a lane departure warning system and a better cross-country performance. Hence, if the Hi-Cross wants to formally appear on the market in future, which also wants to quote the platform of new generation Nissan X-Trail, it had better consider about these SUVs as potential competitors to improve its designing and technology.

References 

Hi-Cross
Cars introduced in 2012
Mid-size sport utility vehicles